Austin Lloyd Clarke (February 18, 1896 — January 29, 1945) was a politician in Manitoba, Canada.  He served in the Legislative Assembly of Manitoba as a Liberal-Progressive representative from 1941 to 1945.

Early life and education
Clarke was born in Cornwall, Ontario, the son of Kenneth and Georgiana Clarke, a family that traced its background to the United Empire Loyalist migration.  He was educated in Cornwall, and later moved to Manitoba. In 1921, Clarke married Flossie Gladys Warner.

Career
Clarke worked as a sales manager, and was president of A. Lloyd Clarke & Co. Ltd. and the Manitoba Motor League.  He served on the municipal council for St. Vital and was reeve from 1938 to 1941, and was also active in freemasonry.

Political life
He was elected to the Manitoba legislature in the 1941 provincial election, defeating Cooperative Commonwealth Federation candidate Edwin Hansford in the constituency of St. Boniface.  In parliament, Clarke was a backbench supporter of the governments of John Bracken and Stuart Garson.

He died in office in 1945.

References 

1896 births
1945 deaths
Manitoba Liberal Party MLAs